Mohd Amier bin Mohd Ali (born 2000) is a Malaysian professional footballer who plays as a right-back for Malaysia Premier League club PDRM.

Club career

Perak
On 9 May 2021, Amier made his Malaysia Super League debut for the club in a 2–3 loss to Sri Pahang.

References

External links 
 

Living people
2000 births
Malaysian footballers
Association football defenders
Perak F.C. players
Malaysia Super League players
Malaysia Premier League players